Fazackerley is a surname. Notable people with the surname include:

 Derek Fazackerley (born 1951), English footballer
 Erin Fazackerley (born 1998), Australian cricketer
 Kim Fazackerley (born 1967), Australian cricketer
 Stan Fazackerley (1891–1946), English footballer
 William Fazackerley (born 1998), former English cricketer

See also
 Fazakerley (disambiguation)